"Jungle" is a song by Fred Again. It was released on 29 June 2022, through Again. and Atlantic. Co-produced by Four Tet, the song heavily samples the song "Immortal" by Elley Duhé.

Release
Prior to release, Fred Again teased the song while at festivals and on social media. It was first played on the radio when it was selected as Clara Amfo's "Hottest Record in the World". It was released in late June 2022.

Charts

References

2022 songs
2022 singles
Four Tet songs
Fred Again songs
Atlantic Records UK singles